Pico de Malpaso (English: "difficult step peak") is the highest point on the island of El Hierro in the Canary Islands, Spain.

Geography 
The summit rises at the centre of the island on the border between Frontera and El Pinar de El Hierro municipalities (Province of Santa Cruz de Tenerife). On the mountain's top, at an elevation of 1,501.762 m above sea level, is located a trig point.

From the mountain one can see the island of La Palma and others islands of Canary archipelago.

Geology 
The island of El Hierro is the youngest of the archipelago and is around 3 million years old. Its present shape is derived from the erosion on its volcanic cone.

Environment 
Malpaso slopes host woods and heaths with relevant samples of Canary Islands juniper (Juniperus cedrus), some of them said to be more than one thousand years old. The most important animal from a conservationist point of view is El Hierro giant lizard (in Spanish lagarto Salmor), an endangered species of reptile.

See also
 List of European ultra prominent peaks

References

Bibliography 
 

El Hierro
Mountains of the Canary Islands
Volcanoes of the Canary Islands
One-thousanders of Spain